Alfie and His Secret Friend is a 1976 children's book by Gunilla Bergström.  Translated by Robert Swindells, it was published in English in 1979.  As an episode of the animated television series it originally aired over SVT on 1 January 1980.

Plot
Alfons is bored, and plays with his secret friend Malcom.  They play with a toy train, and suddenly Alfons' father's tobacco pipe, which they have used for the locomotive, is gone. Alfons' father is upset when they lay the table, while eating and hurry to Kindergarten. Malcom is always there.  When they're gone Malcom gets a present, because he will move. It includes new batteries for Alfons' flashlight.  Using the flashlight, they finally find the tobacco pipe.

In the real world
In February 2009 a 23-year-old man in Sweden, accused for drunk driving, was freed by the law court in a trial which was given attention when he blamed a guy named Malcom for driving his car.

References

1976 children's books
Rabén & Sjögren books
Works by Gunilla Bergström